The Veerse Gat or Veeregat was the sea channel between Walcheren and Noord-Beveland islands in Zeeland in the Netherlands. In 1961 as part of the Delta Plan it was blocked off by the Veerse Gatdam and made into an inland lake called Veerse Meer.

References

Bodies of water of the Netherlands
Channels of Europe
Delta Works
History of Zeeland
Goes
Middelburg, Zeeland
Noord-Beveland
Veere